Saoirse Irish Freedom is the monthly organ of Republican Sinn Féin (RSF). It replaced  Republican Bulletin the first issue of which appeared in November, 1986 to explain the reasons for the split in Sinn Féin.

Its format was eight A4 pages, continuing monthly until, in May 1987. In November of that year, Saoirse became an eight-page tabloid. Since then, the paper has been produced as a 16-page monthly magazine. In June 1996 RSF first published an issue via the Internet.

The name Saoirse Irish Freedom is taken from the 1910 - 1914 publication, Irish Freedom''.

See also
An Phoblacht - newspaper of Sinn Féin
The Socialist (Irish newspaper) - newspaper of the Socialist Party
Socialist Voice (Ireland) - newspaper of the Communist Party of Ireland
The Starry Plough (newspaper) - newspaper of the Irish Republican Socialist Party

References

External links
Official siteincludes archives back to 1987 
Online and searchable copies of Saoirse are available at http://ulib.iupui.edu/digitalscholarship/collections/IrishRepublicanMovement 

Political newspapers published in Ireland
Continuity Irish Republican Army
Political magazines published in Ireland
Republican Sinn Féin
Irish republican newspapers